Bojan Vučković (born 1980) is a Serbian chess Grandmaster.

His current FIDE rating is 2630. He is also strong chess problemist holding title of International solving grandmaster.

External links
 
  (235 games)
 http://www.saunalahti.fi/~stniekat/pccc/sgm.htm

1980 births
Chess grandmasters
International solving grandmasters
Chess double grandmasters
Living people
Serbian chess players